Eugen Matiughin (born 31 October 1981) is a Moldovan international footballer who last played for Dinamo-Auto Tiraspol.

References

 

Living people
1981 births
Moldovan footballers
Moldova international footballers
FC Urartu players
Expatriate footballers in Armenia
FC Dacia Chișinău players
Association football goalkeepers
Armenian Premier League players